Annette Karen Carell (variously Carrell; born Anneliese Erlanger; 7 January 1926 – 20 October 1967) was a German-born American actress of stage, screen, and television who lived in the United States and Britain at various stages of her career. She appeared in American, British, and German films, plays, and television series, including Beyond the Curtain, No Hiding Place, The Prisoner, The Avengers, Out of the Unknown, Our Mother's House, and Z-Cars.

Biography

Early life
Carell was born Anneliese Erlanger in Nuremberg, Bavaria, the daughter of Stephen (Stefan) Erlanger and Lilly Kromwell. Her family was Jewish, and left Nazi Germany for England in the late 1930s. In 1942 the family emigrated from England to the United States, where Carell became a naturalized American citizen on 12 February 1944 in Boston, Massachusetts. She attended the Leland Powers School in Boston.

Career
 
Under the name Annette Erlanger, her first notable acting role was a supporting part in the Washington National Theatre production of Robert E. Sherwood's play The Rugged Path (1945), starring Spencer Tracy. While acting in Germany in the early 1950s, she adopted the stage name Carell. Her most prominent film role was probably in the German-shot Martin Luther (1953) as Luther's wife, Katherine von Bora. She also had supporting roles in Darling (1965), Our Mother's House (1967), and The Vulture (1967).

Personal life
Carell married expatriate British playwright Gerald Savory in New Jersey on 1 September 1953. They returned to England from the U.S. in 1956; the couple had no children.

Carell died of a barbiturate overdose at her home in London on 20 October 1967, in what was ruled a suicide.

Filmography

Films

Television

Notes

References

External links

1926 births
1967 suicides
Actors from Nuremberg
American film actresses
American television actresses
German film actresses
German television actresses
Drug-related suicides in England
Barbiturates-related deaths
Naturalized citizens of the United States
20th-century American actresses
Jewish emigrants from Nazi Germany to the United States
20th-century German women